War Witch is a 2012 Canadian dramatic war film written and directed by Kim Nguyen and starring Rachel Mwanza, Alain Lino Mic Eli Bastien and Serge Kanyinda. It is about a child soldier forced into a civil war in Africa, and who is believed to be a witch. The film was primarily shot in the Democratic Republic of the Congo in French and Lingala.

After premiering at the 62nd Berlin International Film Festival, the film received positive reviews. It won several honours, including ten at the 1st Canadian Screen Awards, notably Best Motion Picture. War Witch was also nominated for the Academy Award for Best International Feature Film.

Plot
During a civil war in sub-Saharan Africa, a 12-year-old girl named Komona is abducted by rebel forces to become a child soldier under a warlord known as the Great Tiger. The rebels compel Komona to kill her own parents. Then, she is sailed to a deserted island with many more children. They are taught to use large weapons and forced to go to war with the rebels. After drinking tree sap, she begins to experience vivid hallucinations. When her visions enable her to survive an attack, she is considered to be a child witch and is viewed as an asset by the Great Tiger, who also attempts to make her a concubine.

Komona and her young love interest, a boy with albinism known as Magician, eventually escape the rebels and move to a town. He hopes to marry her, and she asks him to capture a mystical white rooster to secure her agreement. However, she is kidnapped by one of the Great Tiger's commanders and Magician is killed. After Komona is raped by the commander, she kills him and runs away to her deserted hometown, narrating her life story to her fetus. There, she gives birth to a baby boy whom she names after the magician.

Cast

Production

Montreal director Kim Nguyen wrote the screenplay over a period of 10 years, inspired by an article about children in Burma leading a rebellion force. In researching the film, Nguyen met real child soldiers and humanitarian staff. He envisioned his project as "a redemption story about a child who lives through war and peace."

War Witch was primarily filmed in the Democratic Republic of the Congo. Nguyen discovered Rachel Mwanza and numerous other child actors for his cast in Kinshasa, DRC, after open auditions. Mwanza had never acted before, and was 15 by September 2012. Nguyen said that "Rachel was living in the streets before we did the film". Besides the novice Congolese actors, professional Canadian actors joined the cast.

Most of War Witch was filmed in the order of the story. It was only the second film shot in the DRC in 25 years, and due to security concerns, the crew was accompanied by soldiers with AK-47s, and insurance was challenging to obtain.

Release
The film had its debut at the Berlin International Film Festival on 17 February 2012, where it was seen by 1,500 people. Nguyen became the first Canadian to compete for the Silver Bear in 13 years. In the spring, it played in North America for the first time at the Tribeca Film Festival. It also screened from 14 to 15 September at the 2012 Toronto International Film Festival.

It had a limited release in Toronto and Ottawa on 21 September 2012. At Tribeca, distribution rights were sold for the United States.

Reception

Critical reception

War Witch has a 94% approval rating on Rotten Tomatoes, based on 63 reviews and critical consensus "War Witch is a mature, intense drama that embraces the bruatlity of its subject and invites the audience to sympathize with its protagonist's nightmarish circumstances". It also has a score of 84 out of 100 on Metacritic, based on 16 critics, indicating "universal acclaim".

Guy Dixon, writing for The Globe and Mail, gave the film three stars, saying it transcended war films and Rachel Mwanza gave a great performance. The National Post rated it three stars, declaring it "a film you won’t be able to look away from no matter how hard you want to". Jay Stone of The Winnipeg Free Press assessed the film as "harrowing" with "strikingly authentic performances", including from Mwanza.

Stephen Holden's The New York Times review complimented the film for its portrayal of Komona, lacking luridness or smugness. In Variety, Leslie Felperin said the treatment was appropriately "harrowing" for the topic, and positively reviewed Nguyen's aptitude. The Boston Globe'''s Ty Burr assessed it as "grim yet clear-eyed, and it seeks out glimmers of hope in individual resilience and in the connections that bind us together".

In The Hollywood Reporter, Deborah Young hailed it as an "extraordinary story". University of Berlin film scholar Claudia Kotte wrote War Witch, with Incendies (2010), Monsieur Lazhar (2011) and Inch'Allah (2012), represent a break from focus in the Cinema of Quebec on local history to more global concerns.

Accolades
The film was Canada's entry in the Best Foreign Language Film category at the 85th Academy Awards. It was a rare Canadian submission for featuring a substantial amount of Lingala as well as French. It was among nine shortlisted in December 2012, and became one of the five nominees. Mwanza received a visa to allow her to attend the Academy Awards. It was the third consecutive Quebec film nominated, following Incendies and Monsieur Lazhar'', with Nguyen proclaiming "People around the world are looking at Quebec cinema now and waiting for the next director to come out of here. This has a tremendous impact on a country’s recognition outside of its borders".

The film was in competition for the Golden Bear at the 62nd Berlin International Film Festival in February 2012. It also triumphed at the 1st Canadian Screen Awards, which replaced the Genie Awards that year in honouring Canadian film.

See also
 List of submissions to the 85th Academy Awards for Best Foreign Language Film
 List of Canadian submissions for the Academy Award for Best Foreign Language Film

References

External links
 
 
 
 

2012 films
2012 drama films
2012 war drama films
African witchcraft
Best Picture Genie and Canadian Screen Award winners
Canadian war drama films
Films about child soldiers
Films about witchcraft
Films directed by Kim Nguyen
Films set in Africa
Films shot in the Democratic Republic of the Congo
2010s French-language films
Lingala-language films
Best Film Prix Iris winners
2010s Canadian films
French-language Canadian films
2012 multilingual films
Canadian multilingual films